The Vampire Diaries, an American supernatural drama, was officially renewed by The CW for a full 22-episode season on February 16, 2010. The first episode premiered on September 9, 2010, at 8 p.m. ET. The season picks up immediately after the events of the season one finale. All the series regulars returned. The second season focuses on the return of Elena Gilbert's (Nina Dobrev) doppelgänger, Katherine Pierce, the introduction of werewolves, the sun and moon curse, and the arrival of the original vampires. Tyler Lockwood's (Michael Trevino) uncle, Mason Lockwood (Taylor Kinney), arrives in town searching for the moonstone, a family heirloom. Tyler later learns of his family's werewolf curse. Meanwhile, Caroline Forbes (Candice Accola) is killed by Katherine while having Damon Salvatore's (Ian Somerhalder) blood in her system, turning her into a vampire. The arrival of the original vampires, Elijah (Daniel Gillies) and Klaus Mikaelson (Joseph Morgan), also bring about complications. Klaus is a vampire-werewolf hybrid, but his werewolf side had been forced into dormancy by witches, as nature would not stand for such an imbalance in power. Therefore, Klaus arrives in town with plans to break the curse and unleash his werewolf side by channelling the power of the full moon into the moonstone, sacrificing a vampire and a werewolf, and drinking the blood of the doppelgänger. It became available on DVD and Blu-ray on August 30, 2011.

Cast

Main

Nina Dobrev as Elena Gilbert / Katherine Pierce
Paul Wesley as Stefan Salvatore
Ian Somerhalder as Damon Salvatore
Steven R. McQueen as Jeremy Gilbert
Sara Canning as Jenna Sommers
Kat Graham as Bonnie Bennett
Candice Accola as Caroline Forbes
Zach Roerig as Matt Donovan
Michael Trevino as Tyler Lockwood
Matt Davis as Alaric Saltzman

Recurring

Susan Walters as Carol Lockwood
Daniel Gillies as Elijah Mikaelson
Marguerite MacIntyre as Liz Forbes
Taylor Kinney as Mason Lockwood
David Anders as John Gilbert
Bryton James as Luka Martin
Randy J. Goodwin as Jonas Martin
Michaela McManus as Jules
Lauren Cohan as Rose
Dawn Olivieri as Andie Starr
Joseph Morgan as Klaus Mikaelson
Gino Anthony Pesi as Maddox

Guest

Tiya Sircar as Aimee Bradley
Lisa Tucker as Greta Martin
Trent Ford as Trevor
Maiara Walsh as Sarah
Mia Kirshner as Isobel Flemming
Trevor Peterson as Slater
B.J. Britt as Carter
Courtney Ford as Vanessa Monroe
Simon Miller as George Lockwood
Natashia Williams as Lucy Bennett
Bree Condon as Alice
James Harvey Ward as Cody Webber
Ahna O'Reilly as Jessica Cohen
Arielle Kebbel as Lexi Branson
Bianca Lawson as Emily Bennett (voice only)
Malese Jow as Anna
Kayla Ewell as Vicki Donovan (uncredited)

Episodes

Production
On February 16, 2010, The CW officially renewed The Vampire Diaries for a full 22-episode second season. It premiered on Thursday September 9, 2010, at 8 pm ET. The season finale aired on May 12, 2011.

Casting
On July 9, 2010, Entertainment Weekly announced Taylor Kinney would join the cast in a recurring role as Tyler's uncle Mason, a werewolf who comes to town after his brother dies. Katherine sends Mason to Mystic Falls to get the moonstone for her. He succeeds, but Damon and Stefan find out that he works with Katherine, and Damon kills him. Mason has been described as a "cool" uncle, sexy and athletic. Lauren Cohan joined the cast as Rose, a 500-year-old vampire and possible love interest for Damon. She kidnaps Elena to hand her over to Elijah, but Elena is saved by Stefan and Damon. She then becomes their ally and even starts a small romantic relationship with Damon. She dies after being bitten by werewolf Jules. Sarah Michelle Gellar was offered the role of Rose but turned it down. 

Michaela McManus joined the cast in a guest role as a werewolf who comes to town looking for answers about Mason's death. She helps Tyler deal with the discovery that he is a werewolf, but is later killed during the sacrifice. Bryton James portrays warlock Luka Martin in season two. He befriends Bonnie, but it is later revealed that he and his father work for Elijah. When he tries to save Elijah invisibly, Damon burns him to death. His father Jonas Martin, played by Randy J. Goodwin in season two, is introduced as a friend of Elijah. He is a warlock who, in order to save his daughter Greta, is willing and able to help defeat Klaus. He is later killed by Katherine, who is protecting the Salvatore brothers. 

Gino Anthony Pesi portrays Maddox at the end of season two, a warlock who works for Klaus. Matt shoots him to death when he tries to overcome Damon. On February 18, 2011, it was announced that British actor Joseph Morgan had signed on to play original vampire Klaus.

Storylines

The second season focuses mainly on the arrival of Elena's doppelgänger Katherine Pierce and on her reasons for returning to Mystic Falls. It also introduces werewolves. Tyler's werewolf uncle, Mason Lockwood, arrives after the death of Tyler's father and tells Tyler about the so-called "Lockwood curse" in their family. To activate the werewolf gene, the person must kill someone. Katherine turns Caroline into a vampire, so as to have a spy against Stefan and Elena. Katherine's main reason for returning to Mystic Falls is to find the moonstone, with the help of Mason, who is killed by Damon. Katherine calls in a favor from a witch named Lucy to get the stone. Lucy casts a spell so that when Katherine is hurt, it also affects Elena. 

When Lucy finds out that another Bennett is at the party and that Katherine had deceived her, she puts a spell on the moonstone, injuring Katherine. Damon then leaves her in the original tomb where she is trapped until the spell has been removed from the tomb. She tells him that her reason for not killing Elena is that she is in danger. Elena is later kidnapped by a masked individual and held hostage by vampires Rose and Trevor, who have been on the run from the Originals (the first generation of vampires). Rose reveals to Elena that she is the Petrova doppelgänger and needs to be sacrificed to break the sun and moon curse. Katherine was also a Petrova doppelgänger, who used Trevor to help her escape from the Originals and Rose to turn her into a vampire to save herself. Elena is rescued by Stefan and Damon by stabbing Elijah with a sharp wooden pole and they escape. 

Klaus, one of the original vampires, arrives and is now hunting Elena. His brother Elijah has made a deal with Elena to protect her loved ones, because he wants to use her as bait to lure Klaus and kill him. Jules, a friend of Mason, tells the Lockwoods that Mason never came back to Florida and is missing. Alaric is suspicious of Jules and calls Damon to the Grill (local town hangout). Jules reveals that she is a werewolf. Damon tells Jules she won't find Mason and to leave town. Jules breaks into the Salvatore mansion in wolf form and attacks Damon, but Rose pushes him out of the way, getting bitten on the shoulder instead (werewolf bites are lethal to vampires). As Rose succumbs to the effects of the bite, Damon stakes her in a glorious dream they share, giving her a peaceful death. 

Uncle John returns to Mystic Falls and comes as an unpleasant surprise to Elena, Damon, Jenna, and Alaric. John reveals to Damon that the only way to kill an Original is with a dagger dipped in white ash wood. A boy named Luka settle in the town with his father (they are both warlocks) and reveals that they are working for Elijah because Klaus has his sister Greta and they want him (Luka) dead as well. Luka becomes friends with Bonnie and tells her that Klaus will be weakened by the sacrificial ritual, meaning that Elena has to die so that Elijah can kill him and free his sister. John gives Damon the special dagger to kill Elijah. 

Elena finds out that if a vampire uses the dagger, that vampire will die. Stefan warns Damon and Alaric stabs Elijah, but he pulls the dagger out and tells Elena their deal is off. Elena stabs herself in the stomach, and Elijah begs her to let him heal her. She stabs him with the dagger and leaves it in him. Elijah's death means that Katherine is no longer compelled to stay in the tomb. She helps kill the Martin witches. When Isobel returns to town, Katherine double-crosses the Salvatores by kidnapping Elena and stealing the moonstone for Klaus in exchange for her freedom. But it is revealed that Klaus wanted Katherine and compelled Isobel to get her and the moonstone.

Klaus enters Alaric's body and compels Katherine to stay in Alaric's house. Bonnie and Jeremy find the site of the a witch massacre and Bonnie channels all the power. Alaric/Klaus blends with Stefan, Damon, and Elena and finds out that Bonnie has her powers. Damon tells Bonnie to put on a protection spell and make Alaric/Klaus believe that she is dead. Elena does not want Bonnie to die, so she pulls the dagger out of Elijah's heart. After Elijah comes to life, Elena learns the full history of Klaus. The Aztec curse is fake and there is a curse on Klaus, as he is a vampire born in a werewolf bloodline. There is a ritual that involves killing a vampire and a werewolf and a Petrova doppelganger, that will unearth the werewolf side of Klaus making him a hybrid.

Elena realizes that the real curse is on Klaus, who therefore wants to kill her. But Elijah says he has an elixir that can save Elena from dying. Elena believes Elijah, but Damon says that there is another way to save her life and feeds her his blood. Stefan tries to stop him, but he stabs in the chest with the wooden dagger. Elena then cries that she will be a vampire against her will. Maddox kidnaps Tyler and Caroline. Damon frees them and is bitten. Then he goes to Klaus to tell him that he does not have a werewolf and witch, as he killed Maddox. Klaus says that he has backups. Klaus takes Elena from Stefan. Elena sees Jenna, who thinks she is dead, but Greta tells her she is transitioning. Damon asks Katherine about the vampire, and she says that Jenna is the backup vampire. He then checks his arm and sees that Tyler has bitten him.

In the season's finale, Klaus is working on the ritual out in the woods and is near completion when he is about to kill Elena, but Stefan tries to work a deal with him. Klaus agrees to have Stefan work for him in exchange for Damon's protection. Elena is "killed" in the ritual but is shown to have survived. Regardless, Klaus's werewolf side is unleashed and he becomes the first hybrid, half vampire half werewolf. Bonnie arrives and subdues Klaus with her powers, giving Elijah the opportunity to strike, but Klaus talks him down offering to help find their siblings. Elena's survival is revealed as John had Bonnie cast a spell that had him die in Elena's place. The next morning John succumbs and dies. At his funeral, Elena reads a note from John saying he will always love her and she will always be his daughter, even if she becomes a vampire. Damon also shows where he was bitten and walks away.

Reception

Critical response
Based on 12 reviews, the second season currently holds a 100% on Rotten Tomatoes with an average rating of 8.07 out of 10. The site's critics consensus reads, "The sophomore season of Vampire Diaries is top shelf guilty pleasure, balancing wild twists and cliffhangers without going off the rails."

Ken Tucker of Entertainment Weekly wrote, "The throbbing red heart of The Vampire Diaries remains the tension between Damon and Paul Wesley's Stefan, and their mutual attraction to whomever Dobrev is embodying at the time." Mark A. Perigard of the Boston Herald said, "The triangle – quadrangle? – becomes more twisted by episode's end. It leads to shocking violence against outsiders that deepens the tragedy and the mythology at the core of the show. "Game on" just might be the two most chilling words uttered this season." Matt Roush of TV Guide commented, "The Vampire Diaries is the sort of show where 'never say die' is written into the mythology – a good thing for several of the opening hour's apparent victims. I don't know how much longer The Vampire Diaries can keep churning stories at this feverish rate, but if this is your sort of guilty pleasure, you'd be crazy not to bite."

Ratings

Accolades
For its second season The Vampire Diaries won five Teen Choice Awards, one People's Choice Award, and a nomination in Saturn Awards.

Home media
The Vampire Diaries Season 2 was made available on DVD and Blu-ray on August 30, 2011. In region B, it was released on August 22, 2011.

Notes

References 

2
2010 American television seasons
2011 American television seasons